Events from the year 1442 in France

Incumbents
 Monarch – Charles VII

Deaths
 29 August – John V, Duke of Brittany (born 1389)
 18 December – Pierre Cauchon, bishop (born 1371)

References

1440s in France